EUBC is an abbreviation that may refer to:

European Boxing Confederation
Edinburgh University Boat Club, the rowing club of Edinburgh University, Scotland